Cleveland Pro Soccer is an American professional soccer team that is located in Cleveland, Ohio. It is an independent team and will participate in MLS Next Pro in 2025.

History 
On November 21, 2022, MLS Next Pro announced that a new independent club will join the league in 2025. The club will be owned by Michael Murphy and Nolan Gallagher. The team’s name, colors, and crest will be revealed at a later date along with the stadium location and seating capacity.

Players and staff

Current roster

Staff

See also 
 MLS Next Pro

References

External links 
 Official website

Association football clubs established in 2022
2022 establishments in Ohio
Soccer clubs in Ohio
MLS Next Pro teams